Artur Vladimirovich Akoyev (born 2 January 1966 in Digora, North Ossetia-Alania) is a Russian weightlifter. He won a silver medal in the heavyweight class at the 1992 Summer Olympics in Barcelona.

References

External links 
 
 
 
 

1966 births
Living people
Russian male weightlifters
Soviet male weightlifters
Olympic weightlifters of the Unified Team
Olympic silver medalists for the Unified Team
Olympic medalists in weightlifting
Weightlifters at the 1992 Summer Olympics
Medalists at the 1992 Summer Olympics
World Weightlifting Championships medalists
People from Digorsky District
Sportspeople from North Ossetia–Alania